Exechia is a genus of fungus gnats in the family Mycetophilidae. There are more than 180 described species in Exechia.

See also
 List of Exechia species

References

Further reading

External links

 

Mycetophilidae
Articles created by Qbugbot
Bibionomorpha genera